Sønningen is a lake in the municipality of Levanger in Trøndelag county, Norway.

See also
List of lakes in Norway

References

Levanger
Lakes of Trøndelag